Driffield, also known as Great Driffield, is a market town and civil parish in the  East Riding of Yorkshire, England. The civil parish is formed by the town of Driffield and the village of Little Driffield.

Driffield is named The Capital of the Wolds, due to its location sitting centrally within the Yorkshire Wolds.

According to the 2011 UK census, Driffield parish had a population of 13,080, an increase on the 2001 UK census figure of 11,477.

The town was listed in the 2019 Sunday Times report on the Best Places to Live in northern England.

History

Driffield is of Anglo-Saxon origin, and the name is first attested in the Anglo-Saxon Chronicle where King Aldfrith of Northumbria died on the 14 December 705. It is also found in Domesday Book of 1086, meaning "dirty (manured) field".

A Bronze Age mound outside Driffield was excavated in the 19th century, the contents of which are now kept in the British Museum. It includes a knife, a dagger, a beaker and a greenstone wrist-guard all dating to between 2200 and 1500 BC.

The remains of Driffield Castle, a motte-and-bailey castle, sit at Moot Hill.

RAF Driffield was targeted by the Luftwaffe during the Second World War. On 15 August 1940, a raid by Junkers 88s resulted in 14 deaths and many injuries. RAF Driffield was the site of the first death in the WAAF during the Second World War.

Governance
Driffield is a major part of the Driffield and Rural electoral ward. This ward stretches north west to Sledmere with a total population taken at the 2011 Census of 15,199. The local Member of Parliament is Greg Knight.

Culture and amenities

Driffield is centred around Middle Street, its main high street of both independent and chain shops and retail (such as WHSmith, Iceland, Yorkshire Trading Company, B & M, Boyes, Wilko, Superdrug and Boots. On a Thursday, a market is held in the town centre. Its original cattle market closed in 2001.

The town's main hotel is the Bell Hotel, an old coaching inn in the centre of the town. Public houses and bars include, The Full Measure, the Original Keys, Buck, Royal Oak, Tiger Inn, the Benjamin Fawcett (Wetherspoons), the Blue Bell, and 'Forty One'. It also has a micro-pub The Butcher's Dog.

Restaurants and takeaways include the Water Margin, Stuart's Fish & Chips of Driffield, El Dorado's, Trishna's, The Scullery, Marco Polo, and Muskan Spice. Cafe's include the cycle friendly The Bike Cave.

The town is home to Driffield Show, the UK's largest one-day annual agricultural show, as well as the Driffield Steam and Vintage Rally - an event held each August showcasing historical vehicles including traction engines, fairground organs, tractors and vintage cars and trucks. A particular focus is placed upon agricultural history, with demonstrations of ploughing and threshing often taking place. The rally is particularly known for the Saturday evening road-run of the steam engines and other vehicles into Driffield town centre, an event which invariably attracts large crowds of spectators.

Driffield also has a small community hospital (known as Alfred Bean Hospital), a fire station, a local police station, and several churches.

Driffield lies in the Yorkshire Wolds, on the Driffield Navigation canal, and near the source of the River Hull. This is maintained by the Driffield Navigation Trust and the group hosts an annual raft race and open day gala at the River Head.

The Driffield Beck runs roughly parallel to the main high street. Some stretches of Driffield Beck are popular for fishing, particularly for brown trout and grayling.

Education
There are two infant schools (Driffield Northfield Infant School and Driffield Church Of England
Voluntary Controlled Infant School), and one larger junior school (Driffield Junior School), which caters for children aged 7–11.  Driffield School & Sixth Form is a large secondary school that also contains a sixth form, and so offers education up to A level standard. The town also includes Kings Mill Special School. The nearest independent school is Pocklington School.

Transport 

Driffield lies on the A614, A166 and B1249.

The town is served by Driffield railway station on the Yorkshire Coast Line, with services currently run by Northern and has direct trains to Sheffield, Doncaster, York, Hull, Beverley, Bridlington, and Scarborough.

East Yorkshire Motor Services provide regular services to Hull, Pocklington, Beverley, Bridlington, York and Scarborough.

Demography

Religion

There are nine churches in Driffield, which work together as 'Churches Together in Driffield'.

The Anglican church dedicated to All Saints was designated a Grade I listed building in 1963 and is now recorded in the National Heritage List for England, maintained by Historic England.  St Mary's church is within the same benefice as All Saints but actually sits in neighbouring Little Driffield. (There was once a second Anglican Church in Driffield itself, dedicated to Saint John and located on St Johns Road, but it has been demolished.)

There is a small Roman Catholic Church dedicated to Our Lady and Saint Edward that was built in 1886. The Methodist Church stands on Middle Street North. The former 1880 building, was demolished in November 2018 and replaced by a modern building. Bourne Methodists is a Primitive Methodist Church, sited on Westgate. The Salvation Army have a building on The Mount.

Driffield Christian Fellowship is an Elim Pentecostal church who have a building on Wansford Road. Their church service is held in the Performing Arts Hall at Driffield School. The Congregational Church is situated on Exchange Street. The Revive Church meets in the Community Centre on Mill Street.

Traditions
The age-old tradition of Scrambling is unique to the town of Driffield and has its origins in the 18th century. The event takes place a couple of days into the New Year. Children walk through the main street shouting an ancient rhyme to shopkeepers in return for money and goodies. The cry is "Here we are at our town's end...With a shoulder of mutton and a crown to spend...Are we downhearted?..No!...Shall we win?...Yes!..."

It is also tradition for the townspeople of Driffield to congregate in the market place on New Year's Eve and listen for the church bells ringing in the new year.

Climate
The climate in Driffield is warm and temperate, with higher than average rainfall. This climate is considered to be Cfb according to the Köppen-Geiger climate classification. In Driffield, the average annual temperature is 9.5 °C. The average annual rainfall is 719 mm.

Sport
Driffield was formerly home to Driffield Mariners Football Club, who have won three Hull Sunday League titles in recent years. Now to this present day, there are two main men's team who both play at the second highest league in the East Riding. Driffield Junior Football Club and Driffield Evening Institute who both play in the Humber Premier League Division One. Driffield also has its own football league, Driffield and District League and was founded in 1919 and currently only has 1 division which consists of 9 teams from within Driffield and district.

The town has a cricket club, the first team of which play in the ECB Yorkshire Premier League North. First class cricketers Andrew Gale, Richard Pyrah, Steven Patterson, Jonny Bairstow, Ishara Amerasinghe and Abid Ali have all played for the club.

Driffield RUFC is a member of the RFU and Yorkshire RFU, playing its senior fixtures in the Regional 1 North East and Women's Championship North 2 leagues. The club field five senior teams (four men's and a women's), a colts team (both boys and girls) and mini/juniors (at every age group from under 7's to under 17's).

Driffield Hockey Club play their home matches at Driffield Sports Centre and currently field three men's teams and four ladies' teams, as well as juniors and vets sections. For a catchment area the size of Driffield, the club is relatively successful, with both the men's and ladies first XIs being promoted from their respective YHA Yorkshire Premier Divisions at the end  of the 2013–14 season (6th tier of English Hockey) to the North League Division 2 East and North League Division 2 South East respectively (5th tier of English Hockey).

Driffield has an 18-hole golf club that has been at its present location since 1934.

Driffield featured on the route of the 2017 Tour de Yorkshire.

Driffield has a sports centre located on Bridlington Road, which opened in 2009 replacing the old sports centre (now owned by Driffield School). The new sports centre includes a main pool and learner pool, sports hall, a 50-piece gym, and a studio/multi-use room.

Media
Driffield and the Wolds are served by the local newspaper, Driffield & Wolds Weekly, launched in August 2015. The Driffield Times ceased publication in 2016.

Great Driffield Radio, launched in November 2018 on 107.2 FM, broadcasts across the town and surrounding villages.

In popular culture
Slaughterhouse Studios was a recording studio in the town between 1985 and 1992. Bands including Napalm Death, The Mission, and most notably Happy Mondays would record there.

Twin towns
 Saint Affrique, France

Notable people
Benjamin Fawcett, 19th century woodblock colour printer
Hazel Gaynor, author
Alexander Francis Lydon, woodblock colour printer who worked with Benjamin Fawcett
Curtis Woodhouse, former professional footballer and boxer
Mick Woodmansey, drummer with David Bowie's band the Spiders from Mars

References

Sources

External links

Driffield Online

 
Market towns in the East Riding of Yorkshire
Civil parishes in the East Riding of Yorkshire
Towns in the East Riding of Yorkshire